Michael Gitlin (born 1943 in Cape Town, South Africa) is a contemporary sculptor.

Life and work
Michael Gitlin's family emigrated from South Africa to Israel in 1948. Gitlin received his BA in English Literature and Art History from the Hebrew University of Jerusalem (1967). He simultaneously studied at the Bezalel Academy of Arts and Design in Jerusalem, graduating in 1967. Gitlin moved to New York City in 1970 and received an MFA from Pratt Institute (1972). His first museum show was at the Israel Museum in Jerusalem in 1977. That same year, his work was exhibited at the Documenta in Kassel, Germany. Gitlin was represented by the Schmela Gallery in Düsseldorf and works of his were acquired by such institutions as the Stedelijk Museum in Amsterdam and the Gugghenheim Museum in New York. In the 1980s, Gitlin taught sculpture at the Parsons School of Design and Columbia University in New York, the Bezalel Academy of Art in Jerusalem, and the University of California in Davis.

Gitlin's one-person museum shows have included: the Israel Museum, Jerusalem (1977); the ICC Antwerp (1980); Exit Art, New York (1985); Kunstraum Munchen (1986); Bonn Kunstverein (1988); Kunsthalle Mannheim (1989); Carnegie Mellon Art Gallery (1989); Museum van Hedendaagse Kunst Antwerpen (1991).
Gitlin is a member of the generation of Post-Minimalist artists working in Manhattan and Europe in the early 1970s that included Gordon Matta-Clark, Benni Efrat, Joel Shapiro, Joshua Neustein, Robert Grosvenor, Nahum Tevet, and Ulrich Rückriem, among others.

Gitlin's work can be characterized as abstract and reductive. He began his career working three-dimensionally, first with paper and later with wood, using paper as a medium rather than a support. His sculptures are mostly wall pieces, which depend on architecture for their physical and contextual support. In a 1996 catalogue for a show at Katrin Rabus Gallery in Bremen, Germany, Barry Schwabsky describes Gitlin's work as "characterized above all by its restlessness [...]. The object in crisis – for Gitlin at least, and perhaps only for him, such is the risk of the artist – implicates the subject of sculpture more than its means. For the sculptor, there is the object and there is the space it inhabits, and these must have a determinate relationship. This relationship is perhaps the true subject of the work." 

In recent years, Gitlin has worked with steel wool, copper wire, foam, and black spandex. Drawing too has always been a demanding part of Gitlin's project.

Education

 M.F.A, Pratt Institute, New York, 1970–1972
 Hebrew University, Jerusalem, 1964–1967
Bezalel Academy of Arts and Design Academy, Jerusalem, 1963–1967

Teaching
 Columbia University, 1987
 Bezalel Academy of Arts and Design Academy, Jerusalem, 1977–1978 and 1985
 Parsons School of Design, New York, 1976–1977 and 1981–1984
 New School, New York, 1973–1974
 Pratt Institute, New York, 1971–1972

Awards and Prizes
 1984 National Endowment for the Arts Fellowship, National Endowment for the Arts, USA
 1987 Guggenheim Fellowship—Sculpture and Drawing
 1988 Augustus St. Gaudens Memorial Fellowship
 1989 Israel Museum Sandberg Prize
 1991 Pollock-Krasner Foundation Grant
 2000 George and Janet Jaffin Prize, America Israel Cultural Foundation
 2005 New York Foundation for the Arts (NYFA) Fellowship

Selected Museum Collections
British Museum, London
Brooklyn Museum, New York
Detroit Institute of Arts, Detroit
Fogg Museum, Harvard University, Cambridge
Solomon R. Guggenheim Museum, New York
Haifa Museum of Modern Art, Haifa, Israel
Hirshhorn Museum and Sculpture Garden, Washington D.C.
Leopold Hoesch Museum, Duren, Germany
Israel Museum, Jerusalem, Israel
Jewish Museum, New York
Kaiser Wilhelm Museum, Krefeld, Germany
Kunstverein Ingolstadt, Ingolstadt, Germany
Museum Ludwig, Cologne, Germany
Kunsthalle Mannheim, Mannheim, Germany
Marl Sculpture Museum, Marl, Germany
MUSMA, Museum of Contemporary Sculpture, Matera, Italy
Neues Museum Weserburg, Bremen, Germany
MOMA Museum of Modern Art, New York/>

New York Public Library, New York
Rijksmuseum, Amsterdam, Netherlands 
Kröller-Müller Museum, Otterlo, Netherlands
Städtische Galerie im Lenbachhaus, Munich, Germany
Städtische Galerie, Erlangen, Germany
Stedelijk Museum, Amsterdam, Netherlands
Tel Aviv Museum of Art, Tel Aviv, Israel
Wilhelm-Hack- Museum, Ludwigshafen, Germany
Wilhelm-Lehmbruck-Museum, Duisburg, Germany

External links 
 
 
 
  Michael Gitlin's official website
  Michael Gitlin on artnet
 :de:Documenta 6 Michael Gitlin in Documenta 6 exhibition
  AbsoluteArts on Michael Gitlin's 2003 exhibition at the Slought Foundation in Philadelphia: "Unconventional Three-Dimensional: Michael Gitlin and Michael Zansky"
  12 April 1987 The New York Times article on Guggenheim Fellowship recipients who are also New York residents
  Augustus Saint-Gaudens in New York
  Michael Gitlin at the Hirshhorn Museum
  Michael Gitlin at the Nelly Aman Gallery
  Michael Gitlin bio at Art Affairs, recent September 2009 Amsterdam exhibition
  Michael Gitlin at Weserburg Museum in Germany

Artists from Cape Town
South African sculptors
South African emigrants to Israel
Bezalel Academy of Arts and Design alumni
Living people
1943 births
Hebrew University of Jerusalem alumni
Pratt Institute alumni
Columbia University faculty
University of California, Davis faculty
Academic staff of Bezalel Academy of Arts and Design
Israeli sculptors
Israeli painters
Sandberg Prize recipients